The Enduroman Arch to Arc Triathlon is an ultra-distance triathlon and is regarded as the “Hardest Triathlon on the planet” The triathlon starts with an 87-mile undulating run (140 km) from London's Marble Arch to Dover on the Kent coast, then a cross-Channel swim (shortest distance 21 miles/33.8 km) to the French coast, and finishes with a 180-mile undulating (289.7 km) bike ride from Calais to the Arc de Triomphe in Paris. 

The clock starts at Marble Arch, London and stops at the Arc de Triomphe, Paris. Only 52 athletes have ever completed the challenge globally.  the record for the course is 49 hours and 24 minutes, set by Lionel Jourdan, beating the previous record of 50 hours and 24 minutes, set by Mayank Vaid of India. On August 19, 2011, Rachael Cadman became the first woman to complete the challenge, in 97 hours, 37 minutes. Joanne Rodda finished in 78 hours, 39 minutes on 30 September 2014 to become the fastest female finisher.  In August 2015, 25-year-old Freddie Iron became the youngest man to complete the Arch to Arc, in a time of 77 hours, 17 minutes. On 21 September 2015, at 53 years old, Grantley Bridge became the oldest man to complete it, in 88 hours, 7 minutes.

In 2018, Frenchwoman Marine Leleu finished the competition in 69h52, setting the new female record for the event. She lost her title a few weeks later to Perrine Fages who finished the competition in 67h21. The record was beaten next year by Jacomina Eijkelboom with 66h56.  

In August 2022, Richard Stabler (GB) ran 192km in total following an adverse change in the English channel weather during his first attempt. (52km initially ran) & then the full (140km) 2 days later on his ultimately successful A2A attempt. 

Non-wetsuit world record holders are Chris Leek (GB) with 69:29 in August 2019 and Jenny Smith (USA) with 72:26 in August 2022. 

 the relay record is held by the six-person Team Manchester's Blood Brothers, with an overall time of 33 hours, 5 minutes in September 2014.

In August 2017, Douglas Waymark got into difficulty about half-way through the cross-Channel swimming element of the event. After being airlifted to William Harvey Hospital in Ashford, he later died.

Results
These are the notable results of the solo event by year.

References

External links
Official website

Triathlon competitions